Taking up and staining strongly with Chromium salts. 

Chromaffin may refer to:

Chromaffin cells, neuroendocrine cells in the adrenal medulla.
Chromophil cells, hormone producing cells showing chromaffin granules that readily absorb chromium stains.